Events from the year 1654 in England.

Incumbents
 Lord Protector – Oliver Cromwell
 Parliament – First Protectorate (starting 3 September)

Events
 20 March – establishment of Commission of Triers which will fill empty Anglican benefices with Puritan ministers.
 5 April – signing of the Treaty of Westminster ends the First Anglo-Dutch War, and the Dutch agree to observe the Navigation Acts.
 11 April – Anglo-Swedish alliance: A commercial treaty between England and Sweden is signed.
 12 April – Oliver Cromwell creates a union between England and Scotland, with Scottish representation in the Parliament of England.
 10 July – Peter Vowell and John Gerard are executed in London for plotting to assassinate Cromwell. 
 August – Cromwell launches the 'Western Design', an expedition to the Caribbean to counter Spanish commercial interests, effectively beginning the Anglo-Spanish War (which will last until after the Restoration in 1660). The main fleet leaves Portsmouth on 25 December. 
 3 September – First Protectorate Parliament assembles.

Births
 10 January – Joshua Barnes, scholar (died 1712)
 22 January – Richard Blackmore, physician and writer (died 1729)
 22 February – Elizabeth Monck, Duchess of Albemarle (died 1734)
 27 April – Charles Blount, deist (died 1693)
 23 June – Richard Onslow, 1st Baron Onslow, politician (died 1717)
 John Bellers, educationist (died 1725)

Deaths
 10 January – Nicholas Culpeper, astrologer (born 1616)
 8 February – John Talbot, 10th Earl of Shrewsbury (born 1601)
 19 February – Edmund Chilmead, writer (born 1610)
 3 June – Alethea Howard, Countess of Arundel (born 1585)
 27 June– Thomas Gataker, clergy (born 1574)
 28 June – John Southworth, martyr (born 1592)
 10 July – Peter Vowell, Royalist conspirator (year of birth unknown)
 August – Roger Dodsworth, antiquary (born 1585)
 30 November
 William Habington, poet (born 1605)
 John Selden, lawyer (born 1584)
 6 December (bur.) – Sir William Brockman, military leader and politician (born 1595)

References

 
Years of the 17th century in England